This is a list of players that participated in the women's wheelchair basketball competition at the 2016 Summer Paralympics.

Group A







The following is the Great Britain roster in the women's wheelchair basketball tournament of the 2016 Summer Paralympics.



Group B

The following is the Algeria roster in the women's wheelchair basketball tournament of the 2016 Summer Paralympics.









References

Women's team rosters
2016 in women's basketball
2016